Pyrgotos (old name:  Kyuleli / Külahli) is a village south of the City of Kilkis in the Kilkis regional unit, Greece. It is part of the municipal unit Gallikos and has a population of 163 people (2011).

References 

Populated places in Kilkis (regional unit)